Kino Flo is a manufacturer of professional LED-based lighting equipment for cinema and television and production. Located in Burbank, California, Kino Flo is best known for developing proprietary LEDs based on a color science technology that ensures color quality for lighting both close-ups and on large studio spaces. In 1995 Kino Flo earned a technical achievement award from the Academy of Motion Pictures Arts and Sciences for developing cool, tube-based arrays with color-correct tungsten and daylight balanced light that "changed the way motion picture movies are made," according to the academy.

History
According to director Wim Wenders, as discussed on the Criterion Collection edition of his 1977 gangster film, The American Friend, Robby Müller first assembled and utilized a primitive Kino Flo unit in 1976, during the shooting of the film. The Kino Flo unit was legitimized in 1987, during the filming of the movie Barfly. Director of photography Robby Müller was filming in a cramped interior was unable to fit traditional lights into the location. In order to work around the problem, the film's gaffer Frieder Hochheim and best boy Gary Swink designed a high-output fluorescent light that had a remote ballast, allowing the lamp unit to become small and lightweight enough to be taped to the wall. Hochheim and Swink subsequently created a company, Kino Flo Incorporated, to manufacture and market their innovation to the film industry. The new lights were quickly embraced by cinematographers, and now are considered a staple of a standard motion picture lighting package.

Technology
The two major innovations of the unit were the high-frequency ballast, which gave the lights greater intensity and eliminated flicker commonly found in off-the-shelf fluorescent tubes, and the Kino Flo tubes, which contained a number of special phosphors designed to eliminate the characteristic tints in the magenta-green spectrum which are present in most domestic fluorescent lights. Since the type of tube determines the color temperature, any Kino Flo lamphead can be quickly converted between daylight and tungsten balances by simply changing out the tubes. Mid-range color temperature can also be created by mixing tubes of both color temperatures. Kino Flo have also expanded their tube line in recent years, creating visual effects tubes optimized for bluescreen and greenscreen spectra, as well as a variety of other shades for general color effects.

References

External links

Film and video technology
Lighting brands
Stage lighting instruments
Entertainment companies based in California
Manufacturing companies based in Los Angeles
American companies established in 1987
Entertainment companies established in 1987
Manufacturing companies established in 1987
1987 establishments in California
Products introduced in 1987